Elliot K. Fishman is an American diagnostic radiologist,  currently the director of diagnostic imaging and body CT and professor of radiology and radiological science at Johns Hopkins University School of Medicine.

Fishman specializes in 3D imaging and rendering.  To date, he has published over 1,300 peer-reviewed publications and has co-authored 10 textbooks.

Career 
Fishman received his medical degree in 1977 from the University of Maryland School of Medicine.  He then did his residency at Sinai Hospital and subsequently completed a fellowship in CT at Johns Hopkins Hospital.  In 1981, he joined the Johns Hopkins University faculty as an Assistant Professor and was promoted to Professor of Radiology and Oncology ten years later, in 1991.  Currently, he also serves as the Director of Diagnostic Imaging and Body Computed Tomography, and is a member of the Johns Hopkins Kimmel Cancer Center.  He is also co-principal investigator of the Felix Project for Early Detection of Pancreatic Cancer and co-chair of Image Wisely's executive committee.

Fishman has won the Diagnostic Imaging’s 2016 Radiology Lifetime Achievement Award; the 2016 Aunt Minnie Best Radiology Mobile App; and the RSNA Honored Educator Award for 2012, 2014, 2016, and 2018.  He received an endowed professorship from the Johns Hopkins University School of Medicine in 2018.

In the 1980s, Fishman worked in 3D imaging with Pixar Animation Studios.

He also owns and runs a website called CTisus, subtitled "Everything you need to know about Computed Tomography (CT) & CT Scanning."

References 

University of Maryland School of Medicine alumni
Johns Hopkins University faculty
American radiologists
Year of birth missing (living people)
Living people